San Canzian d'Isonzo is a comune (municipality) in the province of Gorizia, in Friuli – Venezia Giulia, Italy.

Its name refers to the martyrs Cantius, Cantianus, and Cantianilla, who are said to have been beheaded here in 304 AD.

It is also the birthplace of Italian footballer and former Milan manager Fabio Capello.

Hamlets 
 Pieris

Notable people
Gastone Bean
Lucio Bertogna, professional footballer
Fabio Capello, Italian former professional football manager and player
Mario Tortul
Tullio Zuppet, (1926 - 1998), professional football player (Atalanta 1946-49) and top manager of FIAT Auto

References